Cyphoma intermedium, common name : intermediate egg shell, is a species of sea snail, a marine gastropod mollusk in the family Ovulidae, the ovulids, cowry allies or false cowries.

Description
The shell size varies between 18 mm and 50 mm

Distribution
This species is distributed in the Caribbean Sea, the Lesser Antilles, Colombia, Venezuela, Eastern Florida, Brazil.

References

 Lorenz F. & Fehse D. (2009). The Living Ovulidae - A manual of the families of Allied Cowries: Ovulidae, Pediculariidae and Eocypraeidae. Conchbooks, Hackenheim, Germany

External links
 

Ovulidae
Gastropods described in 1828